The P2 transport was a United States Maritime Commission design for a passenger ship which could be readily converted into a troop transport. Three variants of the design were built, the P2-SE2-R1 (Admirals), P2-S2-R2 (Generals), and P2-SE2-R3 (Presidents).

Admirals

Ten P2-SE2-R1 ships were ordered by the Maritime Commission in World War II. The ships were laid down by the Bethlehem Shipbuilding Corporation in Alameda, California. The intended use of these ships after the war was trans-Pacific service. As ordered, the ships were named after U.S. Navy admirals. Only eight ships were completed as troop transports for the navy, with the last two ships canceled on 16 December 1944. Despite being canceled, the last two ships were completed after the war to the P2-SE2-R3 design as civilian ships.

In 1946 the ships were all decommissioned by the navy and transferred back to the Maritime Commission, and from there to the United States Army. The army operated them with civilian crews as part of the Army Transport Service and renamed them after generals of the United States Army. In 1950 the ships were transferred back to the navy, but not recommissioned. Instead they were assigned to the Military Sea Transportation Service, manned by a civil service crew, and keeping the names the army had given them.

Generals

Eleven P2-S2-R2 ships were ordered by the Maritime Commission in World War II. The ships were laid down by Federal Shipbuilding and Dry Dock Company of Kearny, New Jersey. The intended use of these ships after the War was for South American service. As ordered, the ships were all named after United States Army generals.

Unlike the Admirals, the Generals did not have a relatively uniform life after World War II. Three were transferred to the Army as the Admirals had been, of which one was disposed of by the Army and converted to a passenger liner before the Korean War. Five were retained by the Navy and were transferred to the Military Sea Transportation Service in October 1949 to be manned by civilian crews, and two others were transferred to American President Lines with the intent of being converted to a passenger liners, but ended up being chartered troop ships that in the Korean War were rejoined to military control as part of the Military Sea Transportation Service.

Ships in class

Presidents
As noted above, the last two Admirals were canceled in 1944 while under construction. The President Wilson was later renamed SS Oriental Empress when sold to C.Y. Tung in 1978.

References

 United States Maritime Commission P-Type Passenger Ships
 The Ships List: American President Lines

 

Auxiliary ship classes of the United States Navy
Transport ships of the United States Army
Transports of the United States Navy
Turbo-electric steamships